Tawhero is a suburb of Whanganui, in the Whanganui District and Manawatū-Whanganui region of New Zealand's North Island.

Demographics

It had a population of 2,943 at the 2018 New Zealand census, an increase of 375 people (14.6%) since the 2013 census, and an increase of 222 people (8.2%) since the 2006 census. There were 1,098 households. There were 1,449 males and 1,491 females, giving a sex ratio of 0.97 males per female. The median age was 39 years (compared with 37.4 years nationally), with 636 people (21.6%) aged under 15 years, 552 (18.8%) aged 15 to 29, 1,173 (39.9%) aged 30 to 64, and 582 (19.8%) aged 65 or older.

Ethnicities were 67.7% European/Pākehā, 35.8% Māori, 7.1% Pacific peoples, 5.0% Asian, and 1.5% other ethnicities (totals add to more than 100% since people could identify with multiple ethnicities).

The proportion of people born overseas was 10.6%, compared with 27.1% nationally.

Although some people objected to giving their religion, 46.7% had no religion, 35.6% were Christian, 1.0% were Hindu, 0.2% were Muslim, 0.7% were Buddhist and 6.9% had other religions.

Of those at least 15 years old, 183 (7.9%) people had a bachelor or higher degree, and 666 (28.9%) people had no formal qualifications. The median income was $22,200, compared with $31,800 nationally. The employment status of those at least 15 was that 852 (36.9%) people were employed full-time, 309 (13.4%) were part-time, and 150 (6.5%) were unemployed.

Education

References 

Suburbs of Whanganui